Amanda Mays Bledsoe (born February 15, 1978) is an American politician from Kentucky. She is a member of the Republican Party and has represented District 12 in the Kentucky Senate since January 1, 2023. Bledsoe is a graduate of the University of Kentucky and resides in the city of Lexington. Her experience includes working as a senior policy analyst and an adjacent instructor.

References 

1978 births
21st-century American politicians
Living people
Politicians from Lexington, Kentucky
Republican Party Kentucky state senators
Women state legislators in Kentucky
21st-century American women politicians